Tin King Estate is a public housing estate in Tuen Mun, New Territories, Hong Kong. It is the tenth public housing estate in Tuen Mun, located near Light Rail Tin King stop, Leung King stop and San Wai stop. It consists of four residential buildings completed in 1989. The estate was formerly the site of Leung Tin Village and it was named from the village, together with the nearby Leung King Estate. Some of the flats were sold under Tenants Purchase Scheme Phase 2 in 1999.

Siu Kwai Court and Siu Pong Court are Home Ownership Scheme courts in Tuen Mun near Tin King Estate, built in 1990 and 1991 respectively.

Houses

Tin King Estate

Siu Kwai Court

Siu Pong Court

Demographics
According to the 2016 by-census, Tin King Estate had a population of 9,610 while Siu Kwai Court had a population of 3,784. Altogether the population amounts to 13,394.

Politics
Tin King Estate, Siu Kwai Court and Siu Pong Court are located in Tin King constituency of the Tuen Mun District Council. It is currently represented by Leung Ho-man, who was elected in the 2019 elections.

Education
Tin King Estate is in Primary One Admission (POA) School Net 70. Within the school net are multiple aided schools (operated independently but funded with government money) and the following government schools: Tuen Mun Government Primary School (屯門官立小學).

See also
Public housing estates in Tuen Mun

References

Residential buildings completed in 1989
Tuen Mun
Public housing estates in Hong Kong
Tenants Purchase Scheme
1989 establishments in Hong Kong